Munagala is a village in the Suryapet district in the state of Telangana. It is located in Munagala mandal of Kodad revenue division..It is 24km far away from the district headquarters Suryapet.

References

Cities and towns in Suryapet district
Mandal headquarters in Suryapet district